Our Lady of Good Counsel (Albanian: Universiteti Katolik "Zoja e Këshillit të Mirë", UNIZKM) is a private Catholic university in Tirana and Elbasan, Albania. The subject are taught in Italian.

Organization
UNIZKM has three Faculties:

Faculty of Medicine
Dentistry
Nursing
Medicine and Surgery
Physiotherapy
Faculty of Social Sciences and Communication:
Department of Political Science and International Relations
Department of Journalism and Communication
Faculty of Economic Sciences
Faculty of Pharmacy
Faculty of Architecture

See also 
 List of universities in Albania

References

Universities in Albania
Educational institutions established in 2004
Universities and colleges in Tirana
2004 establishments in Albania
Catholic universities and colleges in Albania